The 1961 German Grand Prix was the 23rd time the German Grand Prix (or Grosser Preis von Deutschland) motor race was held. The race also held the honorary designation of the 21st European Grand Prix. It was run to Formula One regulations as race 6 of 8 in both the 1961 World Championship of Drivers and the 1961 International Cup for Formula One Manufacturers It was held on 6 August 1961 over 15 laps of the giant 14.2 mile Nürburgring Nordschleife circuit for a race distance of almost 213 miles. The race also celebrated the 100th race since the establishment of the World Championship in 1950.

The race was won by British driver Stirling Moss, driving a Lotus 18/21 for privateer outfit the Rob Walker Racing Team; it proved to be his 16th and last Grand Prix victory. Moss started from the second row of the grid and led every lap of the race. It was the first German Grand Prix victory for a rear-engined car since Bernd Rosemeyer's Auto Union Type C took victory in 1936. Moss finished just over 20 seconds ahead of Ferrari 156 drivers Wolfgang von Trips and Phil Hill, breaking a four-race consecutive run of Ferrari victories. The result pushed Moss into third place in the championship points race, becoming the only driver outside Ferrari's trio of von Trips, Hill and Richie Ginther still in contention to become the 1961 World Champion with two races left.

Jack Brabham's Cooper took full advantage of the new Coventry-Climax V-8 in qualifying. Brabham qualified second, and shot to the lead by the first corner. However, Brabham crashed before the end of the first lap due to a sticking throttle. It was the last home country appearance for points leader von Trips before his death at the Italian Grand Prix five weeks later. His second-place finish saw Ferrari secure the constructors' championship. The remaining championship points scorers were all from British racing teams. Scottish driver Jim Clark (Lotus 21) was fourth for Team Lotus; former motorcycle World Champion John Surtees (Cooper T53) was fifth for Yeoman Credit Racing and young New Zealander Bruce McLaren was sixth in his factory-run Cooper T58.

Of the race's 26 starters, 17 finished the race with 16 of them classified finishers. Bernard Collomb (Cooper T53) did not complete the 75% race distance in order to be classified as a finisher.

Classification

Qualifying

Race

Championship standings after the race

Drivers' Championship standings

Constructors' Championship standings

 Notes: Only the top five positions are included for both sets of standings. Only the best 5 results counted towards the Championship. Numbers without parentheses are Championship points; numbers in parentheses are total points scored.

References

German Grand Prix
German Grand Prix
European Grand Prix
German Grand